The Festival of fire or the Celebration with theme of fire is held in many places of the world.

The festivals of fire in the world

Africa
AfrikaBurn, South Africa

Americas
Bonfire Night, Canada
Bonfires of Saint John
Burning Man, Western, US

Asia
Festival of Burning the Character Big, Japan
Diwali, India
Gozan no Okuribi, Kyoto, Japan
The Oroqens' Fire Festival (オロチョンの火祭り), Hokkaido, Japan
Sagicho Fire Festival, in many places in Japan
The Yi people's Torch Festival, China

Europe
Beltane Fire Festival, Edinburgh, Scotland
Bonfires of Saint John
Falles, Valencia, Spain
Guy Fawkes Night, United Kingdom
Sechseläuten, Switzerland
Up Helly Aa, Shetland, United Kingdom

Oceania
Guy Fawkes Night

Other uses
Wresling Festival of Fire, the annual professional wrestling tournament
Fire Festival, a Japanese drama film

See also
Festival of Lights (disambiguation)
Outline of festivals

References

External links
Top 10 fire festivals around the world (Reuters)

Ceremonial flames
Rituals